The 1976 World Team Tennis season was the third season of the top professional team tennis league in the United States. Led by regular season and playoff male most valuable player Sandy Mayer and female playoff most valuable player Billie Jean King, the New York Sets swept the San Francisco Golden Gaters in the WTT Finals to win the league championship.

Competition format
The 1976 World Team Tennis season included 10 teams split into two divisions (Eastern and Western). Each team was scheduled to play a regular-season schedule of 44 matches.

The top two teams in each division qualified for the playoffs and met each other in the division championship series. The first-place team was given a choice of hosting either the first and third or second and third matches of the series. The division champions met in the best-of-five World Team Tennis Finals with the lower seed hosting the first two matches and the higher seed hosting the remaining matches.

Each match comprised one set each of men's singles, women's singles, men's doubles, women's doubles and mixed doubles. Starting with this season, the order of play for the entire match was determined by the coach of the home team. Games were decided by the first player or doubles team to reach four points with no-ad scoring. Each set ended when one team had won either six or seven games and had an advantage over its opponent of at least two games. Sets that were tied 6–6 were decided by a tiebreaker. Set tiebreaker games were nine total points with the first player or doubles team to reach five the winner. An advantage of only one point was needed to win a tiebreaker game. Starting this season, if the team that won the final set was trailing in the match, the match went to overtime with the same players who participated in the final set remaining on the court. The leading team was required to win a game to end the match. If the match was tied at the end of five sets, or if the trailing team won enough games in overtime to tie the match, a super tiebreaker game was played between the players who participated in the final set using the same format as the set tiebreaker games.

Player draft
WTT conducted its player draft for the 1976 season on December 11, 1975, at the Essex House in New York City. Teams made their selections in reverse order of their regular-season finish from the 1975 season. The players chosen in the first five rounds of the draft are listed in the tables below. The biggest news at the draft was the trade of the rights to Ilie Năstase by the New York Sets immediately after they used their third-round pick on him, to the Hawaii Leis. Năstase expressed interest in playing WTT but not in New York, because New York fans had widely criticized him for his on-court behavior and emotional outbursts. The Sets had previously agreed to allow the Leis to negotiate with Năstase with compensation going from Hawaii to New York if the Leis were to reach a deal with him. The Leis immediately announced that they had signed Năstase to a one-year contract worth in excess of $100,000. Leis owner Don Kelleher would not describe the amount with any more specificity than, "It was six figures." The Leis sent undisclosed cash consideration and future draft picks to the Sets to complete the deal.

First round

Second round

Third round

Fourth round

Fifth round

Standings
Reference:

 New York and Boston each played only 43 matches, because their August 9 match was canceled due to Hurricane Belle.

Playoff bracket
Reference:

Playoff match results
Reference:

 Home teams are in CAPS.

Eastern Division Championship

Western Division Championship

WTT Finals

Of the total of 8 playoff matches, home teams won 5 and lost 3. The higher seeds had 3 wins and 1 loss in their 4 home matches. The higher seeds won 2 of the 3 matchups.

Individual statistical leaders
The table below shows the individual players and doubles teams who had the best winning percentages in each of the five events in WTT.

Individual honors
Reference:

All-Star Classic
The 1976 WTT All-Star Classic was played on July 10, at Oakland-Alameda County Coliseum Arena in Oakland, California. The West overcame a 21–17 deficit after four sets when Betty Stöve and Dianne Fromholtz beat Martina Navratilova and Virginia Wade in a tiebreaker and then proceeded to win three consecutive overtime games to send the match to a super tiebreaker. A crowd of 12,581 fans watched both teams make substitutions for the super tiebreaker. Chris Evert entered for Fromholtz, while Billie Jean King and Evonne Goolagong replaced Wade and Navratilova. Evert forced Goolagong into an error to seal the West victory.

See also

 1976 WTA Tour
 1976 Men's Grand Prix circuit

References

External links
 Official WTT website

World Team season
World Team Tennis season
World TeamTennis seasons